Patricia Gibson (born 12 May 1968) is a Scottish National Party (SNP) politician serving as SNP Spokesperson for Environment, Food and Rural Affairs since December 2022. She served as the SNP Shadow Secretary of State for Housing, Communities and Local Government since 2021 to 2022. She has been the Member of Parliament (MP) for North Ayrshire and Arran since winning the seat at the 2015 general election.

Early life and career

Gibson was born and educated in Glasgow. She received a BA (Hons) and MA (Hons) in English and Politics from the University of Glasgow. She taught English for over twenty years.

Political career 
In 2007, Gibson was elected to the Glasgow City Council as a councilor for the Greater Pollok ward, on which she served until 2012. While on the council, she was the SNP's spokesperson for education on the Glasgow city council.

In the 2010 election, Gibson contested the North Ayrshire & Arran constituency, achieving a 2.3% swing from Labour to the SNP, however lost to the incumbent Katy Clark.

In the 2015 election she was elected the MP for North Ayrshire & Arran, winning a majority of 13,573 votes. Between July 2015 and May 2017 Gibson was a member of the Procedure Committee.

Gibson was reelected as the MP for North Ayrshire & Arran in the 2017 election, however with a reduced majority of 3,633 votes over the Conservative candidate David Rocks. In June 2017 she was appointed the SNP spokesperson for Consumer Affairs. Between September 2017 and 6 November 2019, Gibson was a member of the Backbench Business Committee.

Gibson was again reelected as the MP for North Ayrshire & Arran in the 2019 election, with an increased majority of 8,521 votes. Since March 2020, she has been a member of the Backbench Business Committee.

Sexual misconduct allegations 

In March 2021 an SNP member of staff at Westminster complained that Gibson had sexually harassed him in a Parliamentary bar. Gibson said the accusations were "malicious" and "without any foundation". It was reported that Gibson threatened legal action against newspapers that had considered identifying her in coverage over the allegations.

On 16 April 2022, The Times reported that the complaint of sexual harassment against Gibson had been "provisionally upheld" by Parliament's Independent Complaints and Grievance Scheme (ICGS). 

On 23 June 2022, the report on the complaint was published. The complaint of sexual harassment was initially upheld, but her appeal against the finding, on the grounds that the investigation had made some technical clerical errors, succeeded. It found the complaint was not malicious.

In June 2022, Gibson admitted she was too drunk to recall exactly how she acted around the SNP member of staff who accused her of sexual harassment.

In August 2022, it was revealed that Gibson claimed in a submission that it was "discriminatory" to say that the impact of sexual harassment of a man by a woman is the same as by a male against a female.

Personal life 
Gibson lives in Kilbirnie, North Ayrshire which is within her parliamentary constituency.

She is married to Kenneth Gibson, a Member of the Scottish Parliament.

References

External links 

 SNP profile
 

1968 births
Alumni of the University of Glasgow
Female members of the Parliament of the United Kingdom for Scottish constituencies
Living people
Politicians from Glasgow
Scottish National Party MPs
Scottish schoolteachers
UK MPs 2015–2017
21st-century Scottish women politicians
21st-century Scottish politicians
UK MPs 2017–2019
UK MPs 2019–present